Jason Calvin Garrett (born March 28, 1966) is a former American football player and coach and current broadcaster. He previously served as the head coach of the Dallas Cowboys for 9.5 seasons, from 2010-2019. Garrett has also been offensive coordinator and assistant head coach for the Cowboys and quarterbacks coach for the Miami Dolphins. 

Before becoming a coach, Garrett was a college football quarterback at Princeton University and also played as quarterback in the National Football League (NFL) for the Cowboys (winning three Super Bowls as the backup quarterback for Troy Aikman), New York Giants, Tampa Bay Buccaneers, and Miami Dolphins. 

In 2022, Garrett became a sports broadcaster and currently works as a football analyst for NBC Sports - as a commentator for their coverage of the USFL and Notre Dame football and as an analyst for their NFL pregame show Football Night in America.

Early life
Garrett attended kindergarten through second grade at Holy Cross school in Rumson, New Jersey. He went to prep school at University School in Hunting Valley, Ohio, and was a letterman in football, basketball, and baseball. As a senior, Garrett won All-League honors as a quarterback and safety. He graduated from University School in 1984.

College career
Garrett was accepted to Princeton University, where he began as the starting quarterback of the freshman team, registering 64 completions on 116 attempts for 996 yards. Garrett transferred to Columbia University when his father Jim Garrett became the head coach in 1985. Following his father's resignation after Columbia's 0–10 1985 season, Garrett and his brothers (Judd and John) transferred to Princeton, although none played varsity in 1986 for different reasons (Jason was an ineligible transfer).

Garrett sat out the 1986 season because of the transfer rules while focusing on running the scout team, which included his brothers. The next year, as a junior, Garrett was named the starting quarterback. Although he piloted Princeton to a win against his former team, Columbia (a loss that gave Columbia the Division I record for straight losses, at 35), Garrett was also involved in a losing effort against them as a senior, snapping Columbia's by then 44-game losing streak. He received the Asa S. Bushnell Cup as the Ivy League Player of the Year. Garrett earned a degree in history in 1989, with a senior thesis on "The Revolt of the Black Athlete as Initiated by Harry Edwards".

Garrett finished his college career completing 366 of 550 passes (66.5%) for 4,274 yards and 20 touchdowns. At the time, he was ranked in the categories: lowest pass interception percentage (1.8% – school record), total yards of offense (4,555 – second in school history), total yards of offense in a season (2,485 – third in school history), most passing yards (4,274 – second in school history), most passing yards in a season (2,217 – fourth in school history), most completions (366 – second in school history), most completions in a season (204 – third in school history), most touchdown passes (20 – tied for fourth). Garrett continues to hold the Ivy League career record for completion percentage with 66.5% (366/550) and his 1988 percentage of 68.2% (204/299) stood as the league record until 2000, when Gavin Hoffman posted a 70.5% mark.

Professional playing career

New Orleans Saints
Garrett was signed as an undrafted free agent by the New Orleans Saints after the 1989 NFL Draft and was eventually signed to the practice squad. On September 3, 1990, he was waived by the Saints and spent most of the year working as a coaching assistant for Princeton.

San Antonio Riders
In 1991, Garrett started at quarterback for the San Antonio Riders of the World League of American Football, but he suffered a separated right wwe 
shoulder in the season opener. Garrett returned to start the sixth and seventh game but was passed on the depth chart by Mike Johnson.

Ottawa Rough Riders
On June 4, 1991, Garrett was signed by the Ottawa Rough Riders of the Canadian Football League, but was released in August.

Dallas Cowboys

In 1992, with the support of his father, at the time a part of the Dallas Cowboys scouting department, Garrett was signed as a free agent. He was released on August 31 and later signed to the team's practice squad. In 1993, his preseason performances allowed him to make the team as the third-string quarterback behind Troy Aikman and Hugh Millen. Garrett eventually passed Millen on the depth chart. In the eighth game of the season, after Aikman injured his left hamstring against the New York Giants in the third quarter. Garrett finished the game, completing five of six passes for 34 yards and leading two touchdown drives. He was named the starter for the next game against the Phoenix Cardinals, where he completed two of six passes for 25 yards and helped the team score on a field goal, before being replaced on the third series in favor of Bernie Kosar, who had been signed four days earlier. Kosar became the backup quarterback for the rest of the season after the game.

The highlight of Garrett's playing career occurred in the 1994 Thanksgiving Day game when he started in place of backup quarterback Rodney Peete, who was out with a sprained thumb he suffered in a win against the Washington Redskins. Garrett led the Cowboys over the Green Bay Packers by completing 15 of 26 passes for 311 yards and two touchdowns in the second half for a comeback win of 42–31, earning him NFC Offensive Player of the Week honors. That game was named the fourth-best moment in the history of Texas Stadium by ESPN in 2008.

In 1998, Garrett was promoted to the backup position and in the second game against the Denver Broncos, after Aikman suffered a broken clavicle, Garrett came in to finish the 23–42 loss. He would start the next five games and contribute to a 3–2 mark for a team that would go on to win the NFC East division by one game over the Arizona Cardinals. In 1999, Garrett started two games for a 1–1 record.

Garrett was a part of the 1993 and 1995 Super Bowl winning teams. In eight seasons with the Cowboys, he played in 39 games and completed 165 of 294 passes (56.1%) for 2,042 yards, 11 touchdowns, and five interceptions.

New York Giants

In 2000, Garrett was signed as a free agent by the New York Giants to back up Kerry Collins. On February 27, 2002, Garrett was released for salary cap reasons and re-signed on July 24, although he would be declared inactive in 16 games, after being passed on the depth chart by Jesse Palmer who was named the backup quarterback. In 2003, Garrett was declared inactive in 11 games as the third-string quarterback.

Tampa Bay Buccaneers

On March 15, 2004, Garrett signed with the Tampa Bay Buccaneers and was cut on August 31. On October 13, he was re-signed by the Tampa Bay Buccaneers. After being declared inactive in week 6 and week 7, he was released on November 6. On November 24, Garrett was signed as a free agent by the Miami Dolphins and was declared inactive for the last six games of the season.

Coaching career

Miami Dolphins
After retiring as a player, Garrett became the quarterbacks coach for the Miami Dolphins for the 2005 season under head coach Nick Saban.

Dallas Cowboys

Offensive coordinator
In January 2007, Garrett was hired by the Dallas Cowboys as offensive coordinator. He guided the Cowboys to the second-best offense in the NFL, which made him an attractive head coaching prospect. In January 2008, Garrett interviewed for the head coaching job of the Baltimore Ravens and the Atlanta Falcons, receiving offers from both, but ultimately opted to remain with the Cowboys. His salary for the 2008 season was nearly $3 million; the highest salary for an assistant coach in the NFL at the time. On December 29, 2008, the Detroit Lions received permission to speak to Garrett regarding the team's head coaching vacancy according to ESPN sources. In January 2009, the Denver Broncos also interviewed him as a possible replacement for fired coach Mike Shanahan. Garrett was also a finalist for the St. Louis Rams head coaching position to replace Jim Haslett, the interim head coach, but the job ultimately went to Steve Spagnuolo.

Head coach

On November 8, 2010, Garrett was named as interim head coach of the Cowboys after fourth-year head coach Wade Phillips was fired after the Cowboys began the 2010 season with a 1-7 record. On November 14, Garrett won his first game as a head coach, beating the favored New York Giants by a score of 33–20 at New Meadowlands Stadium. The next week, he led the Cowboys to a 35–19 victory over the Detroit Lions, their first home win all season. Garrett finished with a 5–3 record down the stretch. On January 6, 2011, Garrett was officially named the eighth head coach in Cowboys history. He was the first head coach born after the team was founded in 1960, and the first former Cowboys player to hold the post.

From 2011 to 2013, Garrett had three straight 8–8 seasons, losing in the last game each season to NFC East division rivals New York Giants, Washington Redskins, and Philadelphia Eagles to miss the division championship and the playoffs each time. In 2014, Garrett achieved head-coaching success for the first time. The Cowboys, featuring several key draft picks maturing on the offensive line and the emergence of DeMarco Murray as a dominant running back, won the NFC East with a 12–4 record and were tied for the best record in the conference with the Green Bay Packers and the Seattle Seahawks. The Cowboys were undefeated on the road, including impressive wins over Seattle and the NFC East frontrunners (at the time), the Philadelphia Eagles. Garrett's team lost the three-way tiebreaker to Green Bay and Seattle and therefore hosted the Detroit Lions in a wildcard-round game. This game, won 24–20 by the Cowboys, featured a controversial "flag pick up" after a penalty during a late Detroit drive, thereby allowing Dallas an improved chance to make a comeback and defeat the Lions. In the ensuing divisional-round playoff game against the Green Bay Packers, hyped as a rematch of the famous Ice Bowl NFL championship game from 1967, Dallas held a lead in the second half, but after losing the lead due to a late Aaron Rodgers touchdown pass, had a potentially game-winning catch by Dez Bryant overturned in official replay, therefore sealing a 26–21 defeat to Green Bay.

On January 13, 2015, Cowboys owner Jerry Jones and Garrett agreed on a contract that kept Garrett in Dallas for five more years and paid him $30 million. The Cowboys entered the 2015 season with great expectations, but starting quarterback Tony Romo played in only four games after suffering two fractures in his left collarbone, and the team finished with a 4–12 mark.

The Cowboys bounced back in 2016 with their best record under Garrett (13–3) with the emergence of rookie quarterback Dak Prescott and running back Ezekiel Elliott, earning the #1 NFC spot in the playoffs and a first-round bye. However, they were upset in their first playoff game by Aaron Rodgers and the Green Bay Packers with a last-second field goal by Mason Crosby, losing the game 34–31. Garrett was named the NFL Coach of the Year for the 2016 season.

In 2017, the Cowboys finished with a 9–7 record and missed the playoffs. This was partially because star running back Ezekiel Elliott was suspended for 6 games due to violating the personal conduct policy. 

In 2018, the Cowboys bounced back from a disappointing 3–5 record at the bye week to win seven of their last eight games and clinch the NFC East for the 3rd time since Garrett became head coach. They won their first playoff game against the Seattle Seahawks, but lost in the divisional round to the Los Angeles Rams.

In 2019, the Cowboys finished with an 8–8 record and missed the playoffs. Toward the end of the season, they had led the NFC East until losing to their division rival, the Philadelphia Eagles in Week 16.

On January 5, 2020, Cowboys owner Jerry Jones announced that the Cowboys would not renew Garrett's contract, which expired at the conclusion of the 2019 season. Garrett finished his Cowboys tenure with an 85–67 record. He was 2–3 in the playoffs, never advancing past the divisional round.

Garrett had the second longest tenure of being the Cowboys head coach after Tom Landry.

New York Giants
On January 17, 2020, Garrett was hired by the New York Giants as their offensive coordinator under new head coach Joe Judge. Garrett tested positive for COVID-19 in December 2020 and missed the team's week 15 game in 2020 against the Cleveland Browns. Garrett was fired from the Giants on November 23, 2021.

After getting fired by the Giants, Garrett was rumored to be the frontrunner for the Duke University football head coaching job to replace long time head coach David Cutcliffe. However, just a few days later, Duke hired Mike Elko as their head coach.

Head coaching record

* – Interim head coach

Broadcasting career
On April 12, 2022, it was announced that Garrett would be an analyst for NBC Sports broadcasts of the United States Football League.  On August 14, it was announced that Garrett has joined Jac Collinsworth as part of Notre Dame Football on NBC.  He also joined Tony Dungy on NBC Sunday Night Football beginning in September.

Personal life
Garrett’s brothers John and Judd also played in the World League of American Football, and Judd made second-team All-World League in 1991 after leading the league in catches. John was the head coach of the Lafayette College football team until 2021 when he was fired, and his younger brother Judd works in the Dallas Cowboys front office after being let go as tight ends coach for the St. Louis Rams. Since he played for the London Monarchs, Judd is the only one of the Garretts who played in the WLAF to have a World Bowl ring. Another brother, Jim Garrett III, is a teacher and former football coach.

In December 2022, Garrett interviewed for the head coaching job at Stanford and was named a finalist. However, he ultimately decided to stay with NBC as a studio analyst.

Garrett's father, Jim Garrett, was an assistant coach for the New York Giants, New Orleans Saints, and Cleveland Browns and head coach of the Houston Texans of the World Football League and at Columbia University. From 1987 to 2004, Jim served as a scout for the Dallas Cowboys.

Garrett resides in Dallas with his wife, Brill.

References

External links

 New York Giants
 Biography at dallascowboys.com
 Just Sports Stats
 

1966 births
Living people
American football quarterbacks
American players of Canadian football
Canadian football quarterbacks
Princeton Tigers football players
Dallas Cowboys coaches
Dallas Cowboys head coaches
Dallas Cowboys players
New York Giants players
New York Giants coaches
Miami Dolphins coaches
Miami Dolphins players
National Football League offensive coordinators
Ottawa Rough Riders players
People from Abington Township, Montgomery County, Pennsylvania
Players of American football from Cleveland
Players of American football from Pennsylvania
Princeton Tigers football coaches
San Antonio Riders players
Sportspeople from Cleveland
Tampa Bay Buccaneers players
University School alumni
Garett family